is a passenger railway station located in the city of Hidaka, Saitama, Japan, operated by the private railway operator Seibu Railway.

Lines

Station layout
The station consists of one island platform serving two tracks. The platform is built on an embankment, and is connected to the station building by an underground passage. There is a third track for trains to bypass the station.

History
The station opened on 10 September 1929.

Station numbering was introduced on all Seibu Railway lines during fiscal 2012, with Koma Station becoming "SI28".

Passenger statistics
In fiscal 2019, the station was used by an average of 2597 passengers daily, making it the 83rd of the Seibu network's ninety-two stations

The passenger figures for previous years are as shown below.

Surrounding area
 
Koma-Musashi New Town

See also
 List of railway stations in Japan

References

External links

 Railway station information

Railway stations in Saitama Prefecture
Railway stations in Japan opened in 1929
Seibu Ikebukuro Line
Stations of Seibu Railway
Hidaka, Saitama